The Cleveland Guardians are a professional baseball team based in Cleveland, Ohio. They were a founding member of the American League in 1901 as the Cleveland Bluebirds or Blues. They were given the unofficial name the Cleveland Bronchos in 1902 before being renamed the Cleveland  Napoleons or Naps in 1903, and then being renamed the Cleveland Indians in 1915. The team remained as the Cleveland Indians for over a century, until the team was renamed the Cleveland Guardians in 2021, after decades of controversy surrounding the "Indians" name. officially becoming the Guardians on November 19, 2021. 
 
The team made its first World Series appearance in 1920 and won the first of their two World Series titles. Since then, the Indians have had three periods of success. The first was from 1947 to 1956, when they had winning records in every season, including a 111–43 record in 1954, which remains the best Major League Baseball regular season record since the 1909 Pirates, and won their only other World Series in 1948. In 1954, they appeared in the World Series, and lost. Cleveland's second highly successful period was from 1994 to 2001, when they had eight consecutive winning seasons, six AL Central division titles, and two World Series appearances in 1995 and 1997, but lost both of these World Series. The third extended period of success began in 2013 under manager Terry Francona, during which they had eight consecutive winning seasons from 2013-2020, five playoff appearances, and one World Series appearance in 2016.

Cleveland has also experienced failure in their history. From the split of the American League into two divisions in 1969 until 1993, the Indians did not make a single postseason appearance and played only four winning seasons. They posted 100 losses four times during the era.

Key

Seasons

Notes

Record by decade 
The following table describes the Guardians' regular season win–loss record by decades.

Records are current through October 3, 2021.

These statistics are from Baseball-Reference.com's Cleveland Indians History & Encyclopedia, except where noted, and are current as of October 3, 2021.

Postseason record by year
The Guardians have made the postseason 16 times in their history, with their first being in 1920 and the most recent being in 2022.

Notes

External links
 Guardians Year-By-Year Results at MLB.com
 Guardians Postseason Results at MLB.com

Cleveland Guardians seasons
Cleveland Guardians
Seasons